East Russell is a coastal locality in the Cairns Region, Queensland, Australia.

Geography

East Russell is located on the coast, east of Babinda, slightly north of Innisfail and south of Cairns.

The Russell River forms the western border of East Russell.

In the north Russell River meets the Mulgrave River at Mutchero Inlet which marks the northern extent of the locality. Much of the coastal area is protected within the Russell River National Park. Several peaks in the park reach elevations above 600 m.

High Island, Normanby Island, Round Island, Russell Island and several offshore reefs belong to the Frankland Group National Park.

The eastern fringe of the locality has some areas of farming. A strip of houses has developed in the north at Point Constantine.

References

External links 

Suburbs of Cairns
Localities in Queensland